Karl-Heinz Bußert (born 8 January 1955) is a German rower who competed for East Germany in the 1976 Summer Olympics.

He was born in Kirchmöser. In 1976, he was a crew member of the East German boat which won the gold medal in the quadruple sculls event. He competed for the SG Dynamo Potsdam / Sportvereinigung (SV) Dynamo.

References 
 
 
 

1955 births
Living people
Sportspeople from Brandenburg an der Havel
People from Bezirk Potsdam
East German male rowers
Olympic rowers of East Germany
Rowers at the 1976 Summer Olympics
Olympic gold medalists for East Germany
Olympic medalists in rowing
World Rowing Championships medalists for East Germany
Medalists at the 1976 Summer Olympics
Recipients of the Patriotic Order of Merit in silver